Among the Betrayed is a 2002 novel by Margaret Peterson Haddix, about a time in which drastic measures have been taken to quell overpopulation.

It is the third of seven novels in the Shadow Children series.  Unlike the first, it is not told from the viewpoint of Luke Garner, but instead from that of Nina Idi, the shadow child who was arrested with Jason Barstow at the end of Among the Impostors. Unlike Jason, who was a member of the Population Police, Nina is another third child who became Jason's pawn. The Spanish Version is called Enter the Betrayed.

Plot
Elodie Luria had left a dreary but emotionally comfortable life with her three aunts and grandmother. For the sake of giving her a chance to live out of hiding, they managed to scrounge together enough savings to purchase a fake ID and identity for her - "Nina Idi" - and sent her to live at Harlow School for Girls. After she fell in love with Jason, a boy at Hendricks School for Boys, she was accused of trying to find shadow children in her school and was arrested by the Population Police along with Jason.

She is given two choices from a Population Police official she calls The Hating Man. She is moved into a different cell with three other children, Matthias, Percy, and Alia, who are ten, nine, and six years old. They are shadow children who have been living on the streets. As Nina befriends them, she struggles with Jason's betrayal and whether or not she should betray her new cellmates to save her own life.

She chooses to help the three of them and all four children escape. They find their way to Hendricks School for Boys. The children hide by the outdoor garden until they are caught by Lee and Trey, who recognize her as Jason's girlfriend. Out of trust for Matthias, Percy, and Alia,. However, even when she gives them a chance to escape, they stay with her. The Hating Man reveals himself to be Mr. Talbot. He had put Nina through a test to see if she really was a shadow child and ready to take a side; she passes. Mr. Talbot also reveals that Jason did not betray her and is not dead, but is still working for the Population Police.

Characters
Nina: A third child who is taken by the Population Police after being betrayed. Her real name is Elodie Luria.
Matthias: The oldest of the three children (10 years old). Nina must decide whether or not to betray him. He is the leader of the trio and will protect Percy and Alia no matter the cost, so is the least willing to trust Nina. He and his friends have lived on the streets under the care of a priest for most of their lives and have been taught the necessary skills to survive as illegal children.
Percy: The smartest of the three children that Nina meets in her imprisonment. He is reserved and looks to Matthias for guidance. He is nine years old.
Alia: The youngest child of the trio Nina meets (6 years old). Despite her age, she is instinctively able to adapt to situations and is extremely observant, allowing her to discern situations much better than Nina or Matthias. She seems to trust Nina the most.

Other characters
Lee Grant: A student at Hendricks School for Boys and the son of the Grant family, powerful and influential Barons. In actuality, he is the third child Luke Garner, the protagonist of Among the Hidden and Among the Impostors.
Trey: A friend of Lee Grant, who helps him tend the outdoor garden at Hendricks School for Boys. He is extremely knowledgeable with scholarly and academic subjects as a result of doing nothing but reading when he lived in hiding as a third child.
The Hating Man: Nina's interrogator and jailer from the Population Police. He is revealed to be Mr. Talbot, a double agent who wanted to test if Nina was an agent of the Population Police or genuinely innocent.
Mr. Hendricks: The headmaster of Hendricks School for Boys and Harlow's School for Girls, boarding schools designed to allow third children to live outside of hiding.
Jason Barstow: Population Police agent, who attempted to betray Lee Grant and other possible third children at the Hendricks and Harlow schools. He was loved by Nina, who feels the greatest amount of betrayal when she is mistaken as his accomplice.

References

External links
Author's official site

2002 American novels
Shadow Children
English-language novels
Novels by Margaret Peterson Haddix
Dystopian novels
2002 science fiction novels
American young adult novels